Dragør Church is a Lutheran church in Dragør, Denmark. It belongs to the Church of Denmark.

History
In 1449, the Bishop of Roskilde authorized the installation of a temporary altar during the annual herring market at Dragør which attracted up to 30,000 traders and fishermen. The market disappeared in about 1500. The few permanent residents had to use Store Magleby Church in nearby Store Magleby some time between 1193 and 1370. After Christian II gave the church to the Dutch farmers who settled in the area in 1621, the church was adapted according to Dutch tradition. Service was also conducted in Dutch and the best seats were reserved for the Dutch families.

Dragør Church was finally inaugurated on 26 April 1885 but remained attached to Store Magleby until 1954 when Dragør finally became its own parish.

Architecture
The church is built in the Neo-Gothiv style. J. H. Wessel's design strongly resembles that of Taarbæk Church north of Copenhagen, which was designed by Carl Emil Wessel, his father.  The ceiling is inspired by the cathedral in Limerick, Ireland.

The clock on the east side of the tower is from 1764 and was installed by clockmaker Bernhard Larsen in 1882.

Graveyard
Notable people who are buried at the graveyard include the actor and comedian Dirch Passer, television presenter Otto Leisner and the marine painter Christian Mølsted whose home and studio in Dragør in now a museum dedicated to his art.

Burials
 Peter Boesen (1945–1982), actor
 Knud Bro (1937–1997), politician
 Christian Brochorst (1907–1967), actor
 Hans Isbrandtsen (1891–1953), shipowner
 Eigil Jensen (1903–1988), lawyer and singer
 Jesper Emil Jensen (1931–009), writer, translator and songwriter
 Otto Leisner (1917–2008), television personality
 Tove Malzer (1941–2008), editor-in-chief and politician
 Hugo Marcussen (1926–1999), architect and civil servant
 Knud Mühlhausen (1909–1990), painter
 Christian Mølsted (1862–1930), painter
 Dirch Passer (1926–1980), actor and comedian
 Clara Selborn (1816–2008), writer and translator
 Sophus Vermehren

Image gallery

References

External links

 Official website

Churches in the Diocese of Copenhagen
19th-century Church of Denmark churches
Buildings and structures in Dragør Municipality
Churches completed in 1885
1885 establishments in Denmark